The Hungarian Radical Party (MRP) was a political party in Hungary in the period after World War II. The party was revived after the end of communism in 1989–90, but remained unsuccessful.

History
The party was founded in November 1944 by Imre Csécsy, although it was not organised properly until the spring of 1945. In the parliamentary elections that year it received just 0.1% of the vote, failing to win a seat. The 1947 elections saw the party increase its vote share to 1.7%, winning six seats.

Prior to the 1949 elections it was forced to join the Communist-led Hungarian Independent People's Front. The Front ran a single list chosen by the Hungarian Working People's Party, with MRP members winning four seats. Following the elections the party ceased to function, although was not officially dissolved.

Parliamentary elections

References

Defunct political parties in Hungary
Political parties established in 1944
Political parties disestablished in 1949
Political parties established in 1989
Political parties disestablished in 1998
1944 establishments in Hungary
1949 disestablishments in Hungary
1989 establishments in Hungary
1998 disestablishments in Hungary
Radical parties